Patriarch Euthymius II may refer to:

 Euthymius II of Constantinople, Ecumenical Patriarch in 1410–1416
 Euthymius II Karmah, Melkite Patriarch of Antioch in 1634–1635